Daniel Bachmann (born 9 July 1994) is an Austrian professional footballer who plays as a goalkeeper for EFL Championship club Watford and the Austria national team.

Bachmann began his career with Stoke City in 2011. During his time at Stoke, he gained first-team experience by going out on loan to Wrexham, Scottish side Ross County and Bury. Bachmann moved to Watford in 2017 and spent the 2018–19 season on loan at Kilmarnock.

Bachmann represented Austria from under-16 to under-21 level, before making his senior international debut in June 2021. He started all of Austria's games at UEFA Euro 2020.

Club career

Stoke City
Bachmann joined English side Stoke City from FK Austria Wien in the summer of 2011. He played with Stoke's under-18 and under-21 squads and joined Conference Premier side Wrexham on loan on 5 August 2014. He played 18 times for the Dragons as they finished in 11th position.

Bachmann joined Scottish Premiership side Ross County on a six-month loan in July 2015. Bachmann made his professional debut on 8 August 2015, coming on for injured goalie Scott Fox in a 2–0 victory over Hamilton Academical. On 31 August 2015, the loan deal was terminated by mutual consent after making just two appearances for the Dingwall side. On 28 October 2015, Bachmann joined League One side Bury on a one-month loan. His loan at Gigg Lane was extended until the beginning of January 2016 when he returned to Stoke after making ten appearances for the Shakers.

Bachmann signed a one-year contract extension with Stoke in July 2016. He was released by Stoke at the end of the 2016–17 season.

Watford
On 1 July 2017, Bachmann signed a three-year deal with Watford.

On 8 August 2018, Bachmann joined Scottish Premiership side Kilmarnock on a season-long loan deal. He made his Watford debut the following season, playing in a 3–3 draw against Tranmere Rovers in the FA Cup third round.

On 14 August 2021, Bachmann played his first game in the Premier League in Watford’s league opener against Aston Villa, where Watford won 3–2.

International career
Bachmann played youth international football for Austria at under-16, under-17, under-18, under-19 and under-21 levels.

On 14 March 2017, he was called up to the senior national team for the first time for games against Moldova and Finland. In March 2021, Bachmann received his second international call-up for the Austria national team ahead of the 2022 World Cup qualifiers in March against Scotland, Faroe Islands and Denmark. He made his debut on 2 June 2021, in a friendly against England. Bachmann started all four games in Austria's UEFA Euro 2020 campaign which ended in the round of 16.

Career statistics

Club

International

References

External links

 
 Profile at Austrian Football Association

1994 births
Living people
Austrian footballers
Association football goalkeepers
Austria international footballers
Austria youth international footballers
Austria under-21 international footballers
UEFA Euro 2020 players
National League (English football) players
Scottish Professional Football League players
Premier League players
English Football League players
FK Austria Wien players
Stoke City F.C. players
Wrexham A.F.C. players
Ross County F.C. players
Bury F.C. players
Watford F.C. players
Kilmarnock F.C. players
Austrian expatriate footballers
Austrian expatriate sportspeople in England
Expatriate footballers in England
Austrian expatriate sportspeople in Scotland
Expatriate footballers in Scotland
Austrian expatriate sportspeople in Wales
Expatriate footballers in Wales
Sportspeople from Wiener Neustadt
Footballers from Lower Austria